Pasqua Coffee was a San Francisco-based retail coffee chain that was named The Pedestrian Café when it opened in 1983. It started as a single store and grew to almost 60 locations in San Francisco, Los Angeles, and New York City before it was acquired by Starbucks Coffee in 1999.

See also

 List of coffeehouse chains

References

Starbucks
Coffeehouses and cafés in the United States
Restaurants in San Francisco
Restaurants established in 1983
1983 establishments in California
1999 mergers and acquisitions